Bharat is a 2019 Indian Hindi-language drama film written and directed by Ali Abbas Zafar. It is jointly produced by Atul Agnihotri, Alvira Khan Agnihotri, Bhushan Kumar, Krishan Kumar, Nikhil Namit and Salman Khan under the banners Reel Life Productions, Salman Khan Films and T-Series. The film stars Salman Khan, Katrina Kaif, Sunil Grover, and Jackie Shroff. Disha Patani makes a special appearance. Tabu makes a friendly appearance. An adaptation of the South Korean drama, Ode to My Father (2014), it traces India's post-independence history from the perspective of a common man, and follows his life from the age of 8 to 70.

Bharat was theatrically released in India on 5 June 2019, on the occasion of Eid al-Fitr. It received mixed reviews from critics, who appreciated the performances of the cast, story and screenplay, criticizing the second half. The film earned 42.30 crores on its first day. It was one of the highest grossing films of 2019. It grossed 325.58 crore in its lifetime theatrical run, becoming a commercial success and the 37th highest grossing Indian film of all time.

Plot 

In 2010, Bharat Kumar, a shopkeeper in Delhi refuses to part with his store despite lucrative offers. On his 70th birthday, he tells his past to his grandniece, and the film goes into flashback.

Partition, 1947
When Bharat was just 7, his parents and siblings board a train to India with many refugees for safety from Pakistan's terrible riots. Bharat loses his baby sister "Gudia" in the chaos. Their father, Gautam, stays there to search for Gudia, after Bharat promises to care for the family. He moves to the imported goods store of Gautam's sister Jamuna and her husband Keemat Rai Kapoor, and meets a roadside circus worker, Radha. They two fall in love, and join The Great Russian Circus.

17 years later (1964)
Bharat has attained a lot of fame in the years he spent at circus. His brother Chote suffers an accident while trying to emulate him. Bharat bids a tearful goodbye to Radha. He and his friend, Vilayti, look for jobs when the country is shocked due to Nehru's death.

11 years later (1975) 
Bharat joins Indian migrants prompted by oil discovery in Saudi Arabia to earn money for his sister Mehek's marriage. There he falls in love with his chief engineer Kumud, who asks him for marriage. Bharat refuses, thinking it would come in his way of fulfilling Gautam's promise. Back in India, Kumud announces her love for him. They begin a live-in relationship.

8 years later (1983)
Jamuna dies; Bharat starts working as a stationmaster. During 1983 Cricket World Cup, Keemat plans to sell the store in need of money, but later offers Bharat to buy it, as the latter refuses to sell it to anyone and still hopes Gautam will come back. With Vilayti, Bharat leaves India as a sailor for 8 months and earns money to buy the store.

12 years later (1995)
After economic liberalization in India and globalization, Kumud becomes the creative director of newly formed Zee TV and runs a program to unite the relatives separated during the partition. Due to this Bharat converses with Meher, a London citizen adopted by a British family during the partition, and realizes she is Gudia, who returns to India. An emotional reunion ensues. Janki dies; Bharat hopes to find Gautam also.

Present day (2010)
Bharat decides to sell the store, which he stubbornly refused to do despite losses. Before reaching the train, Gautam promised he will unite with him at store, explaining why Bharat held on to the store for so long. He realizes Gautam is probably too old to survive still. He sees a vision of him, assuring Bharat kept his promise and asking him to move on. Tearful, he finally marries Kumud and moving on.

Cast 
 Salman Khan as Bharat Gautam Kumar
 Kabir Sajid Sheikh as Young Bharat Gautam Kumar
 Katrina Kaif as Kumud Raina / Kumud Bharat Kumar
 Sunil Grover as Vilayti Khan
 Aryan Prajapati as Young Vilayti Khan
 Jackie Shroff as Gautam Darshan Kumar
 Disha Patani as Radha Mathur
 Riva Arora as Young Radha Mathur
 Tabu as Meher Gautam Kumar a.k.a Gudiya
 Satish Kaushik as Naval officer Jayram Shirodkar
 Sonali Kulkarni as Janki Devi / Janki Gautam Kumar
 Asif Sheikh as Hariwant Mehra
 Nivin Ramani as Kayaag Zaveri
 Nora Fatehi as Suzan Vilayti Khan
 Shashank Arora as Chaman "Chote" Gautam Kumar
 Kashmira Irani as Mehek Gautam Kumar / Mehek Hariwant Mehra
 Kumud Mishra as Keemat Rai Kapoor
 Ayesha Raza Mishra as Jamuna Darshan Kumar / Jamuna Keemat Rai Kapoor
 Shehzaad Khan as National Employment Exchange Officer
Ivan Sylvester Rodrigues as Shurlabh Gupta
 Edwin De La Renta as Pirate Gang Leader Michael Mascarenhas
 Brijendra Kala as Ranjeet Chacha
 Yash Abbad as officer
 Gurvinder Singh Malhotra as Zalzala Singh

Production 
Bharat is a remake of the South Korean film Ode to My Father (2014), which traces the history of South Korea parallel to a man's life, spanning from the 1950s to the 2010s.

Bharat began principal photography in mid-April 2018, and was shot in Abu Dhabi, Spain, Malta, Punjab, Delhi and elsewhere. Priyanka Chopra, who was cast as one of the leading ladies, opted out of the film days before filming her scenes. Nikhil Namit, CEO of Reel Life Productions, said that Priyanka quit due to her engagement to Nick Jonas. She was replaced by Katrina Kaif. Kaif shared the news on her Instagram account that filming was wrapped up on 5 March 2019. The climax was shot in Film City.

Soundtrack

The songs featured in the film were composed by Vishal–Shekhar, lyrics written by Irshad Kamil, with music arranger & producer Meghdeep Bose. Zafar wrote and composed the song "Zinda" with Julius Packiam. It is released under the banner T-Series. Devarsi Ghosh of Scroll.in positively summarised the soundtrack review as 'near-perfect.' Firstpost praised the song Chashni as "soul-stirringly beautiful." "Chashni" song was originally sung by Atif Aslam but was replaced.

Release 

Bharat was released on 5 June 2019 on the occasion of Eid al-Fitr, worldwide on 6000 screens including 4700 screens in India. The film was made available for video on demand on Amazon Prime Video in August 2019.

Reception

Critical response 
Bharat received positive reviews from critics on release.

Renuka Vyavahare of The Times of India gave the film three and a half stars out of five, calling it "an exhausting, scattered watch despite the entertainment, humour and nobility it propagates". She concluded, "Bharat is well-intentioned, entertaining and doesn’t succumb to the trappings of commercial potboilers". Priyanka Sinha Jha of News18, praising Khan for his performance rates the film with three stars out of five, and feels that the script is a bit lengthy and required 'sharper' editing. In the end, She says, "For all its virtues, Bharat falls short of becoming a tour de force, but it could turn into a crowd-puller."
Trade analyst and critic Taran Adarsh concurs with Jha on script trimming and gives four stars out of five. Declaring it "smash-hit", he praises Ali for direction, Kaif, and Khan for performance. He feels that the film is an emotional journey that wins the viewers over. Manjusha Radhakrishnan of the Gulf News, also says that it would have benefited from trimming so finds the film 'dull', that is likely to test the patience of the audience. And, she gives it two stars out of five. Ananya Bhattacharya writing for India Today praised acting of Kaif and Khan but feels that the main attraction is Sunil Grover. She also rates it with three stars out of five and concludes that Salman has given his fans 'an out-and-out entertainer'. Rajeev Masand writing for News18, finds the film "unmistakably boring" and "excruciatingly long". He rates the film with two stars out of five. Anna M. M. Vetticad of Firstpost finds the film laden with weak 'humor' and 'lackluster' songs. Rating it with two stars out of five, Vetticad concludes, "Far from being a Forrest Gump with Salman Khan, Bharat is mostly a plodding trek through post-1947 to contemporary India." Jyoti Sharma Bawa of the Hindustan Times finds it 'an emotional Eid winner' and rates it with three stars out of five. Shubhra Gupta of The Indian Express gave two and a half stars out of five and opines, "The good thing about the film, despite its eye-roll moments, is its attempt to create an ‘ordinary’ man without any particular skills.". Anupama Chopra of Film Companion, "Madam Sir, a woman with courage and conviction, is the most memorable character in Bharat. I’d love to see contemporary history told from her perspective.  This version has sweep and swagger but not enough soul."

Box office
Bharats opening day domestic collection was 42.30 crore. This is the highest opening day collection for Salman Khan. On the second day it's screenings dipped in multiplexes, yet remained strong in single-screen theatres and earned 31 crore – raising the total to Rs 78.87 crore. , with a gross of 251.27 crore in India and 74.31 crore overseas, the film has a worldwide gross collection of 325.58 crore.

Bharat is the fifth highest grossing Bollywood film of 2019. Based on domestic net collection the film is among top twenty in the list of Hindi films with highest domestic net collection.

Notes

References

External links
 
 
 

2010s Hindi-language films
2019 action drama films
2019 films
Cultural depictions of Amitabh Bachchan
Cultural depictions of Jawaharlal Nehru
Cultural depictions of Manmohan Singh
Cultural depictions of Rajesh Khanna
Films directed by Ali Abbas Zafar
Films produced by Salman Khan
Films set in the 1960s
Films set in the 1970s
Films set in the 1980s
Films set in the 1990s
Films set in the 2010s
Films set in the partition of India
Films shot in Abu Dhabi
Films shot in Delhi
Films shot in Malta
Films shot in Punjab, India
Films shot in Spain
India–Pakistan relations in popular culture
Indian action drama films
Indian remakes of South Korean films
2019 masala films
T-Series (company) films